Lorenzo Doss (born April 22, 1994) is a former American football cornerback. He played college football at Tulane before being drafted by the Denver Broncos in the fifth round of the 2015 NFL Draft. Doss was on the Broncos Super Bowl 50 championship team after they beat the Carolina Panthers 24–10.

Early years
Doss attended St. Augustine High School in New Orleans, Louisiana, where he was a letterman in football, baseball and track. A teammate of Leonard Fournette, Doss helped lead the Purple Knights to a combined 26-18 record with a pair of state playoff appearances, including a district title as a senior. As a junior, he was named first-team All-District 10-5A and second-team All-metro after catching 23 passes for 352 yards and three touchdowns. He was named honorable-mention 4A All-state and first-team All-District 10-4A as a senior after catching 15 passes for 330 yards (22.0 avg.) while running four times for 35 yards (4.8 avg.). He was selected to represent Orleans Parish in the 2011 Lake Pontchartrain All-Star Classic. Off the field, was a member of the Honor Roll.

Doss also lettered twice in track & field. He competed as a sprinter, and posted bests of 11.2 in the 100 meters, 22.67 in the 200 meters and 51.44 in the 400 meters. He was also a member of the 4x400 relay.

Doss was tabbed the No. 30 recruit in Louisiana by 247Sports.com and No. 76 recruit in the state by ESPN.com. He was listed as the No. 65 athlete in the nation by 247Sports.com, No. 164 wide receiver in the country by Scout.com and No. 233 receiver nationally by ESPN.com. He received an 85 Sports Rating from 247Sports.com and a 70 Scout Grade from ESPN.com. He was rated as a three-star recruit by Rivals.com, Scout.com, and 247Sports.com. In June 2011, he committed to Tulane University to play college football.

College career
Doss became a cornerback at Tulane after playing wide receiver in high school. As a freshman in 2012, he started nine of 12 games, recording 44 tackles and five interceptions. As a sophomore in 2013, he started all 13 games, recording 34 tackles and seven interceptions. As a junior in 2014, Doss had 48 tackles and three interceptions. He was also a member of Tulane's track and field program where he competed in the 100 meter, 4x100 meter relay and 4x400 meter relay team.

On December 11, 2014, Doss announced that he would forgo his senior season and enter the 2015 NFL Draft. He finished his career with 126 tackles and 15 interceptions.

Professional career

Denver Broncos
Doss was drafted by the Denver Broncos in the fifth round, 164th overall, in the 2015 NFL Draft.

On February 7, 2016, Doss was part of the Broncos team that won Super Bowl 50. In the game, the Broncos defeated the Carolina Panthers by a score of 24–10. He was inactive for the game.

On November 23, 2017, Doss was waived by the Broncos for being late to a meeting on Thanksgiving.

Buffalo Bills
On November 27, 2017, Doss was signed to the Buffalo Bills' practice squad. He was released on December 30, 2017.

Carolina Panthers
On January 2, 2018, Doss signed a futures contract with the Carolina Panthers. He was waived on September 1, 2018, but was re-signed the next day. Doss was waived again on September 27, 2018 and was re-signed to the practice squad. He was promoted to the active roster on November 27, 2018.

Doss was released during final roster cuts on August 30, 2019.

Doss was drafted in the 2nd round during phase four in the 2020 XFL Draft by the New York Guardians.

References

External links
Tulane Green Wave bio

1994 births
Living people
Players of American football from New Orleans
American football cornerbacks
Tulane Green Wave football players
Denver Broncos players
Buffalo Bills players
Carolina Panthers players